USCOC or USCoC may refer to:

US Conference of Chaplains, USCoC, a Christian organization of clergy and laity forming uniformed, local community ministry teams
United States Chamber of Commerce, a lobbying group
United States Corps of Chaplains, a non-denominational Christian organization serving the American military